Bung Wai railway station is a railway station located in Bung Wai Subdistrict, Warin Chamrap District, Ubon Ratchathani Province. In the past, it acted as a junction to Ban Pho Mun railway station, but the line was closed in December 1954.

References 

Railway stations in Thailand
Ubon Ratchathani province